Winchester is a city in and the county seat of Franklin County, Tennessee, United States. It is part of the Tullahoma, Tennessee Micropolitan Statistical Area. The population of Winchester as of the 2020 census was 9,375.

History
Winchester was created as the seat of justice for Franklin County by act of the Tennessee Legislature on November 22, 1809, and was laid out the following year. The town is named for James Winchester, a soldier in the American Revolution, first Speaker of the Tennessee Legislature, and a brigadier general in the War of 1812.

Mary Sharp College (originally the "Tennessee and Alabama Female Institute", but later renamed in honor of Mary Corn Sharp, a donor) was founded in 1851 by Z. C. Graves and the Baptist Church. Though a women's college, it offered a classical curriculum based upon what was being offered at the time by Amherst College, Brown University, and the University of Virginia. It closed in 1896. During the 19th century, the institution helped make Winchester an educational center. Other private schools in the city were Carrick Academy for male students (founded in 1809), Winchester Female Academy (founded in 1835), and Winchester Normal College.

The city was occupied first by Confederate and then by Union troops during the Civil War. Winchester, along with the rest of Franklin County, seceded from the Union several months before the rest of Tennessee, unofficially becoming a part of Alabama until the rest of the state seceded. It lay on the line of retreat to Chattanooga followed by the Confederate Army of Tennessee during the campaign of 1863.

Recreation in Winchester received a significant boost when the Tennessee Valley Authority started construction of the Tims Ford Dam along the Elk River in 1966. The project was completed in 1972, and Tims Ford Lake is now known for excellent boating and bass fishing opportunities. Tims Ford State Park is located along the lake's shoreline.

Geography
Winchester is located slightly north of the center of Franklin County, and is bordered to the north by the city of Decherd. The city center is just south of Boiling Fork Creek, now an arm of Tims Ford Lake.

U.S. Route 41A passes through the center of town, coming in from the southeast as South College Street and leaving to the northeast as Dinah Shore Boulevard. Tennessee State Route 16 leaves southwest from the center of town as 1st Avenue and leads  to the Alabama border. U.S. Route 64 bypasses Winchester to the south and east, leading northeast  to Interstate 24 near Pelham and west  to Fayetteville.

Demographics

2020 census

As of the 2020 United States census, there were 9,375 people, 3,556 households, and 2,333 families residing in the city with a median household income of $51,870.  

The number of businesses employing people was 268 as of 2017.

2000 census
As of the census of 2000, there were 7,329 people, 2,992 households, and 2,013 families residing in the city. The population density was 734.6 people per square mile (283.5/km2). There were 3,318 housing units at an average density of 332.6 per square mile (128.4/km2). The racial makeup of the city was 84.51% White, 12.35% African American, 0.22% Native American, 0.52% Asian, 0.05% Pacific Islander, 1.23% from other races, and 1.12% from two or more races. Hispanic or Latino of any race were 2.25% of the population.

There were 2,992 households, out of which 27.5% had children under the age of 18 living with them, 50.2% were married couples living together, 13.7% had a female householder with no husband present, and 32.7% were non-families. 29.2% of all households were made up of individuals, and 14.6% had someone living alone who was 65 years of age or older. The average household size was 2.36 and the average family size was 2.89.

In the city, the population was spread out, with 22.6% under the age of 18, 8.0% from 18 to 24, 25.8% from 25 to 44, 24.0% from 45 to 64, and 19.6% who were 65 years of age or older. The median age was 40 years. For every 100 females, there were 83.8 males. For every 100 females age 18 and over, there were 81.7 males.

The median income for a household in the city was $32,500, and the median income for a family was $41,183. Males had a median income of $31,959 versus $21,629 for females. The per capita income for the city was $16,533. About 13.3% of families and 19.9% of the population were below the poverty line, including 28.6% of those under age 18 and 19.4% of those age 65 or over.

Arts and culture
The High On The Hog Festival, founded in 1987, is a barbecue festival occurring each May.

Infrastructure
Winchester is served by the Winchester Municipal Airport.

Notable people
Notable citizens of Winchester have included four governors of Tennessee: 
 Isham G. Harris
 Henry Horton
 Albert Smith Marks
 Peter Turney

Three natives of the city have been formally honored by the British Crown:
 Francis Joseph Campbell (1832–1914), anti-slavery campaigner and pioneer in educating the blind
 Ida Beasly Elliott (1864–1948), missionary in Burma
 John Templeton, financier and philanthropist

Winchester was also the birthplace of:
 Reuben Davis, a U.S. congressman from Mississippi
 Brian Dayett, New York Yankees/Chicago Cubs Major League Baseball player
 Mike Farris, recording artist, formerly of the Screamin' Cheetah Wheelies
 Phillip Fulmer, former University of Tennessee football coach
 Jeff Hall, former University of Tennessee placekicker
 Tracy Hayworth, Detroit Lions football player
 Jeremy Nunley, football player
 Ed Pryor, music video director and record producer
 Dinah Shore, singer and TV personality

References

External links

 City of Winchester official website
 Franklin County Chamber of Commerce

 
Cities in Tennessee
Cities in Franklin County, Tennessee
County seats in Tennessee
Tullahoma, Tennessee micropolitan area
Populated places established in 1809